The 2005 Rink Hockey World Championship was the 37th edition of the Rink Hockey World Championship, held between 6 and 13 August 2005, in San Jose, United States. It was disputed by 16 countries.

Format

The competition was disputed by 16 countries, divided in four groups of 4 teams each one.

Every game lasted 40 minutes, divided in 2 parts of 20 minutes.

Matches

Group stage

Group A

Group B

Group C

Group D

Championship Knockout stage

5th place bracket

9th to 16th place knockout stage

13th place bracket

Final standings

References

External links
Official

Roller Hockey World Cup
World Championship
Rink Hockey World Championship
Rink Hockey World Championship
International roller hockey competitions hosted by the United States